Women's freestyle 55 kilograms competition at the 2008 Summer Olympics in Beijing, China, was held on August 16 at the China Agricultural University Gymnasium.

This freestyle wrestling competition consisted of a single-elimination tournament, with a repechage used to determine the winner of two bronze medals. The two finalists faced off for gold and silver medals. Each wrestler who lost to one of the two finalists moved into the repechage, culminating in a pair of bronze medal matches featuring the semifinal losers each facing the remaining repechage opponent from their half of the bracket.

Each bout consisted of up to three rounds, lasting two minutes apiece. The wrestler who scored more points in each round was the winner of that rounds; the bout finished when one wrestler had won two rounds (and thus the match).

Saori Yoshida of Japan won the gold medal, her second successive Olympic gold medal in the event after 2004. She defeated China's Xu Li in the final in two periods by fall. The bronze medals went to Canada's Tonya Verbeek, the Athens silver winner, and Colombia's Jackeline Rentería.

Schedule
All times are China Standard Time (UTC+08:00)

Results
Legend
F — Won by fall

Main bracket

Repechage

Final standing

References
Results Book, Page 19

External links
Wrestling – Official Results Book

Wrestling at the 2008 Summer Olympics
Women's events at the 2008 Summer Olympics
Olym